Daryna Kyrychenko (born 14 October 1998) is a Ukrainian snowboarder and Youth Olympics Bronze Medalist.

2016 Winter Youth Olympics
Kyrychenko represented Ukraine at the 2016 Winter Youth Olympics in Lillehammer, Norway where she finished 12th in individual snowboard cross and won bronze in the team competition alongside two Swedish and one Bulgarian athletes.

Performances

References

1998 births
Ukrainian female snowboarders
Living people
Sportspeople from Kyiv
Snowboarders at the 2016 Winter Youth Olympics